Euphaedra ombrophila is a butterfly in the family Nymphalidae. It is found in the northern part of the Republic of the Congo.

References

Butterflies described in 1981
ombrophila
Endemic fauna of the Republic of the Congo
Butterflies of Africa